The Honourable Sir Adolphus Frederick Octavius Liddell, KCB, QC (15 January 1818 – 27 June 1885) was a British civil servant who was Permanent Under-Secretary of State at the Home Office from 1867 until his death in 1885.
The son of Thomas Liddell, 1st Baron Ravensworth, Liddell was educated at Eton College and Christ Church, Oxford, where he took third-class honours in Literae humaniores in 1838, before being elected a fellow of All Souls College, Oxford. He was called to the bar by the Inner Temple in 1844, took silk in 1861, and was created a KCB in 1880.

He was the father of the society figure and lawyer Adolphus George Charles Liddell and the grandfather of Sir Alan Lascelles.

References

External links 
 

English King's Counsel
Permanent Under-Secretaries of State for the Home Department
Younger sons of barons
Knights Commander of the Order of the Bath
19th-century King's Counsel
People educated at Eton College
Alumni of Christ Church, Oxford
Fellows of All Souls College, Oxford
Members of the Inner Temple
1818 births

1885 deaths